Gambling in France holds a current legal status.

In 1987 the minimum gambling age was lowered from 21 to 18. In 1988 slots machines became legal after previously being banned.

There are two main bodies responsible for the regulation of the gambling industry in France – PMU (Pari Mutuel Urbain) and (FDJ) Française des Jeux. PMU deals with horseracing, FDJ is responsible for betting games and lotteries. Both operators are state-owned. 

In 2010 France legalized online gambling as well. It is supervised by ARJEL ("Regulatory authority for online games").

History and contributions
Gambling industry in France has a very long history and some of the oldest and most popular gambling establishments are located on the territory of this country. France also contributed to the development of popular casino games.

It was in France that the Queen became a permanent feature of the deck, replacing the Nobleman in the 1500s.

In the 17th century the French mathematician Blaise Pascal invented the roulette wheel, which later led to the introduction of the roulette game.
Parimutuel betting has a French origin and was invented about 1870.

Remote gambling
The first steps towards legalisation of remote gambling in France were made in 2005, when the European Commission started to investigate the situation in the French gambling market. In 2006 the Commission gave a notice and then in 2007 requested to make amends to the existing law in order to make it compliant with the EU laws. As a result, in 2009 the French government introduced a bill, that partially opened the gambling market to operators from other EU countries
Remote Gambling Association criticized the main provisions of bill for offering unfavourable conditions for the new operators as opposed to incumbent state-owned operators. The main lines of criticism included:
limited range of gambling services that can be offered by operators
unfavourable taxing regime
low payouts for players
stringent requirements, including the necessity to keep gambling servers on the territory of France.

The Law No 2010-476 of 12 May 2010 on the introduction of competition and sector regulation of gambling and online gambling is often referred to as the French Gambling Act. It came into power on May 13, 2010 and opened the online gambling market in France, also creating an official body to regulate the industry – ARJEL (the French Gambling Authority) 3 other regulating authorities can also apply their powers regulating the industry: the French Competition Authority (ADLC), the CSA (An Independent Authority to Protect Audiovisual Communication Freedom) and the CNIL.
There are 3 types of licenses for the 3 types of online gambling activities allowed by the French gambling law:

online sports betting (live betting, pool betting and fixed odds betting) 
online horse race betting (pool betting) 
online poker games (Texas Hold'em Limit, Texas Hold'em pot limit, Texas Hold'em no limit and Omaha Poker 4)

Casino games as well as spread betting and betting exchange are not licensed, because the lawmakers said they were too addictive. Poker is one of the games played at casinos, but it is legal, because the outcome of the game depends on the skill of the player, who can alternate their strategy depending on the game situation. 

Online gambling in France was legalised just before the World Cup 2010. As a result, gamblers opened over 1.2 million accounts on licensed sites in the first month. They bet €83 million which was almost 2 times more than during the same period in 2009, when the only option for legal online betting was turning to state-owned betting websites.

References